Nezihe is a Turkish given name for females. It is also used as a surname. People named Nezihe include:

Given name
 Nezihe Araz (1920–2009), Turkish writer and journalist
 Nezihe Bilgütay Derler (born 1926), Turkish miniaturist, Çini professional
 Nezihe Kalkan (born 1979), Turkish dancer and singer
 Nezihe Muhiddin ( (1889–1958), Ottoman Turkish women activist
 Nezihe Özdil (1911–1984), Turkish rower
 Nezihe Viranyalı  (1925–2004), Turkish female aviator

Surname
 Yaşar Nezihe (1882–1971), Ottoman Turkish poet

See also
 Nezha (given name)

Turkish feminine given names
Surnames of Turkish origin